Ameri (also Romanized as ‘Āmerī) is a village in Bu ol Kheyr Rural District of Delvar District, Tangestan County, Bushehr province, Iran. At the 2006 census, its population was 1,914 in 447 households. The following census in 2011 counted 2,200 people in 573 households. The latest census in 2016 showed a population of 2,581 people in 742 households; it was the largest village in its rural district.

References 

Populated places in Tangestan County